Same Old Story: A Trip Back 20 Years is a 2008 Japanese documentary film about a Japanese musician, Cheep Hiroishi (チープ広石), who takes a look back at his life over the last 20 years. Traveling back to the place he had been two decades ago, he realizes how much time changes so many things. During the film, Hiroishi travels throughout Japan and even to New York to interview people who had known him or of him and what kind of affect his music had on their lives.

Hiroishi travels back to New York to visit the Cove City Sound Studios (CCSS), the place he recorded with his band 20 years before. He meets, once again, Richie Cannata the owner of CCSS. Richie invites him to a live jam session at The Cutting Room in Manhattan where they both "cut it up" with their saxophones.

The film was directed by Kunio Yato, a Japanese graphic designer whose love for music and independent musicians, inspired him to make this documentary. The film had its international premiere in September at the New York International Independent Film and Video Festival on September 22, 2008. It won the Best International Music Documentary at the festival.

External links 
 
 

2008 films
2008 documentary films
Japanese documentary films
Documentary films about music and musicians
2000s Japanese films